Ruthville is a census-designated place and unincorporated community in Ward County, North Dakota, United States. Its population was 191 as of the 2010 census. The town was named after Ruth Mackenroth during the  Depression, and consisted of a grocery Store, and gas station for area farmers.

Demographics

References

Census-designated places in Ward County, North Dakota
Census-designated places in North Dakota
Unincorporated communities in North Dakota
Unincorporated communities in Ward County, North Dakota